Aluminium hydride (also known as alane and alumane) is an inorganic compound with the formula AlH3. Alane and its derivatives are common reducing (hydride addition) reagents in organic synthesis that are used in solution at both laboratory and industrial scales. In solution—typically in etherial solvents such tetrahydrofuran or diethyl ether—aluminium hydride forms complexes with Lewis bases, and reacts selectively with particular organic functional groups (e.g., with carboxylic acids and esters over organic halides and nitro groups), and although it is not a reagent of choice, it can react with carbon-carbon multiple bonds (i.e., through hydroalumination). Given its density, and with hydrogen content on the order of 10% by weight, some forms of alane are, as of 2016, active candidates for storing hydrogen and so for power generation in fuel cell applications, including electric vehicles. As of 2006 it was noted that further research was required to identify an efficient, economical way to reverse the process, regenerating alane from spent aluminium product.

Solid aluminium hydride, or alane, is colorless and nonvolatile, and in its most common reagent form it is a highly polymerized species (i.e., has multiple AlH3 units that are self-associated); it melts with decomposition at 110 °C. While not spontaneously flammable, alane solids and solutions require precautions in use akin to other highly flammable metal hydrides, and must be handled and stored with the active exclusion of moisture. Alane decomposes on exposure to air (principally because of advantitious moisture), though  passivation — here, allowing for development of an inert surface coating — greatly diminishes the rate of decomposition of alane preparations.

Form and structure

Aluminium hydride, or alane, is a colorless and nonvolatile solid. It melts with decomposition at 110 °C. The solid form, however, often presents as a white solid that may be tinted grey (with decreasing reagent particle size or increasing impurity levels). Specifically, depending upon synthesis conditions, the surface of the alane may be  passivated (made somewhat less reactive) by a thin layer of aluminium oxide or hydroxide.

As it is used under common laboratory conditions, alane is "highly polymeric", structurally, and its formula is sometimes presented as (AlH3)n, where the value or range of "n" is not defined. Such preparations of alane dissolve in tetrahydrofuran (THF) or diethyl ether (ether). Solid alane can be precipitated from ether, and the rate of its doing so varies with the method of preparation of the alane solution.

Structurally, alane can adopt numerous polymorphic forms — as of 2006, there were "at least 7 non-solvated AlH3 phases" known: α-, α’-, β-, γ-, ε-, and ζ-alanes.; as of this date, two more, δ- and θ-alanes, have been added. Each has a different structure, with α-alane being the most thermally stable polymorph. For instance, crystallographically, α-alane adopts a cubic or rhombohedral morphology, while α’-alane forms needle-like crystals and γ-alane forms bundles of fused needles. The crystal structure of α-alane has been determined, and features aluminium atoms surrounded by six octahedrally oriented hydrogen atoms that bridge to six other aluminium atoms (see table), where the Al-H distances are all equivalent (172 pm) and the Al-H-Al angle is 141°. 

When β- and γ-alanes are produced together, they convert to α-alane upon heating, while δ-, ε-, and θ-alanes are produced in still other crystallization conditions; although they are less thermally stable, the δ-, ε-, and θ-alane polymorphs do not convert to α-alane upon heating.

Under special conditions, non-polymeric alanes (i.e., molecular forms of it) can be prepared and studied. Monomeric AlH3 has been isolated at low temperature in a solid noble gas matrix where it was shown to be planar. The dimeric form, Al2H6, has been isolated in solid hydrogen, and it is isostructural with diborane (B2H6) and digallane (Ga2H6).

Handling

Alane is not spontaneously flammable. Even so, "similar handling and precautions as... exercised for LiAlH4" (the chemical reagent, lithium aluminium hydride) are recommended, as its "reactivity [is] comparable" to this related reducing reagent. For these reagents, both preparations in solutions and isolated solids are "highly flammable and must be stored in the absence of moisture". When used in standard laboratory quatities and preparations, alane is used in a fume hood. Solids of this reagent type carry recommendations of handling "in a glove bag or dry box". After use, solution containers are typically sealed tightly with concomitant flushing with anhydrous ("dry") inert gas, e.g., nitrogen or argon, to exclude air (and the oxygen and moisture it contains). 

 Passivation greatly diminishes the decomposition rate associated with alane preparations. Passivated alane nevertheless retains a hazard classification of 4.3 (chemicals which in contact with water, emit flammable gases).

Preparation
Aluminium hydrides and various complexes thereof have long been known. Its first synthesis was published in 1947, and a patent for the synthesis was assigned in 1999. Aluminium hydride is prepared by treating lithium aluminium hydride with aluminium trichloride. The procedure is intricate: attention must be given to the removal of lithium chloride.
3 LiAlH4 + AlCl3 → 4 AlH3 + 3 LiCl

The ether solution of alane requires immediate use, because polymeric material rapidly precipitates as a solid. Aluminium hydride solutions are known to degrade after 3 days. Aluminium hydride is more reactive than LiAlH4.

Several other methods exist for the preparation of aluminium hydride:
2 LiAlH4 + BeCl2 → 2 AlH3 + Li2BeH2Cl2
2 LiAlH4 + H2SO4 → 2 AlH3 + Li2SO4 + 2 H2
2 LiAlH4 + ZnCl2 → 2 AlH3 + 2 LiCl + ZnH2
2 LiAlH4 + I2 → 2 AlH3 + 2 LiI + H2

Electrochemical synthesis
Several groups have shown that alane can be produced electrochemically.  Different electrochemical alane production methods have been patented.  Electrochemically generating alane avoids chloride impurities. Two possible mechanisms are discussed for the formation of alane in Clasen's electrochemical cell containing THF as the solvent, sodium aluminium hydride as the electrolyte, an aluminium anode, and an iron (Fe) wire submerged in mercury (Hg) as the cathode.  The sodium forms an amalgam with the Hg cathode preventing side reactions and the hydrogen produced in the first reaction could be captured and reacted back with the sodium mercury amalgam to produce sodium hydride.  Clasen's system results in no loss of starting material. For insoluble anodes, reaction 1 occurs, while for soluble anodes, anodic dissolution is expected according to reaction 2:

 AlH4− - e− → AlH3 · nTHF + H2
 3AlH4− + Al - 3e− → 4AlH3 · nTHF

In reaction 2, the aluminium anode is consumed, limiting the production of aluminium hydride for a given electrochemical cell.

The crystallization and recovery of aluminium hydride from electrochemically generated alane has been demonstrated.

High pressure hydrogenation of aluminium metal
The reaction between the liquified hydrogen produces α-AlH3 which could be recovered under ambient conditions.

Reactions

Formation of adducts with Lewis bases
AlH3 readily forms adducts with strong Lewis bases.  For example, both 1:1 and 1:2 complexes form with trimethylamine.  The 1:1 complex is tetrahedral in the gas phase, but in the solid phase it is dimeric with bridging hydrogen centres, (NMe3Al(μ-H))2. The 1:2 complex adopts a trigonal bipyramidal structure.  Some adducts (e.g. dimethylethylamine alane, NMe2Et · AlH3) thermally decompose to give aluminium metal and may have use in MOCVD applications.

Its complex with diethyl ether forms according to the following stoichiometry:
 AlH3 + (C2H5)2O → H3Al · O(C2H5)2

The reaction with lithium hydride in ether produces lithium aluminium hydride:
 AlH3 + LiH → LiAlH4

Reduction of functional groups
In organic chemistry, aluminium hydride is mainly used for the reduction of functional groups.  In many ways, the reactivity of aluminium hydride is similar to that of lithium aluminium hydride.  Aluminium hydride will reduce aldehydes, ketones, carboxylic acids, anhydrides, acid chlorides, esters, and lactones to their corresponding alcohols.  Amides, nitriles, and oximes are reduced to their corresponding amines.

In terms of functional group selectivity, alane differs from other hydride reagents. For example, in the following cyclohexanone reduction, lithium aluminium hydride gives a trans:cis ratio of 1.9 : 1, whereas aluminium hydride gives a trans:cis ratio of 7.3 : 1.

Alane enables the hydroxymethylation of certain ketones (that is the replacement of C-H by C-CH2OH at the alpha position). The ketone itself is not reduced as it is "protected" as its enolate.

Organohalides are reduced slowly or not at all by aluminium hydride.  Therefore, reactive functional groups such as carboxylic acids can be reduced in the presence of halides.

Nitro groups are not reduced by aluminium hydride.  Likewise, aluminium hydride can accomplish the reduction of an ester in the presence of nitro groups.

Aluminium hydride can be used in the reduction of acetals to half protected diols.

Aluminium hydride can also be used in epoxide ring opening reaction as shown below.

The allylic rearrangement reaction carried out using aluminium hydride is a SN2 reaction, and it is not sterically demanding.

Aluminium hydride will reduce carbon dioxide to methane with heating:
 4 AlH3 + 3 CO2 → 3 CH4 + 2 Al2O3

Hydroalumination

Aluminium hydride has been shown to add to propargylic alcohols.  Akin to hydroboration, aluminium hydride can, in the presence of titanium tetrachloride, add across double bonds.

Fuel

In its passivated form, alane is an active candidate for storing hydrogen, and can be used for efficient power generation via fuel cell applications, including fuel cell and electric vehicles and other lightweight power applications. AlH3 contains up 10.1% hydrogen by weight (at a density of 1.48 grams per milliliter), or twice the hydrogen density of liquid H2. As of 2006, AlH3 was being described as a candidate for which "further research w[ould] be required to develop an efficient and economical process to regenerate [it] from the spent Al powder".

Allane is also a potential additive to rocket fuel and in explosive and pyrotechnic compositions. In its unpassivated form, alane is also a promising rocket fuel additive, capable of delivering impulse efficiency gains of up to 10%.

Reported accidents 

A reduction of trifluoromethyl compound with alane was reported to have caused a "[s]erious [e]xplosion".

Further reading

References

External links 
Aluminium Hydride on EnvironmentalChemistry.com Chemical Database
Hydrogen Storage from Brookhaven National Laboratory
Aluminum Trihydride on WebElements

Aluminium compounds
Metal hydrides
Reducing agents